The 1952 United States presidential election in Oregon took place on November 4, 1952, as part of the 1952 United States presidential election. Voters chose six representatives, or electors, to the Electoral College, who voted for president and vice president.

Oregon was won by Columbia University President Dwight D. Eisenhower (R–New York), running with California Senator Richard Nixon, with 60.54% of the popular vote, carrying every county in the state except Columbia. The challenger, Adlai Stevenson (D–Illinois), running with Alabama Senator John Sparkman, lost the state with 38.93% of the popular vote. This is the last election in which a Republican would win over 60% of the vote in Oregon.

Results

Results by county

See also
 United States presidential elections in Oregon

References

Oregon
1952
1952 Oregon elections